The Constantine Marriott Hotel, in Constantine, Algeria, is one of the largest hotels in the city.
The hotel, is 5 stars  international category, remarkable with it architectural choices and interior design reinterpret the Arabic-Moorish style in a modern key. The stone facade recalls the colours of the desert, while the red of the domes reflects the shades of the interior.
The hotel was renovated with assistance of architects Fabris & Partners of Latisana, Italy.

The renovation included addition of multiple swimming pools by Myrtha pools company.

the hotel offers 180 different type of rooms distributed as 160 standard rooms, 10 executive suites, 10 senior suites and a presidential suite. located within four consecutive blocks that adapt to the underlying ground, connected in between through vertical elements that contain stairs and elevators. The guests are welcomed by a great lobby on more levels that ends with a finely chalk-plated dome from which a sumptuous chandelier goes down.

Landmarks nearby
Very close to some of Constantine's most popular landmarks, such as:
El Bey Mosque built in 1703 also known by its post colonial name Souq El Ghezal Mosque.(2.09 km)
Ahmed Bey Palace (2.2 km)
Emir Abdelkader Mosque
Sidi M'Cid Bridge
Mellah Slimane Bridge
Bab El Kantra Bridge
Sidi Rached Viaduct
Salah Bey Viaduct
Tiddis ruin of a Roman city that depended on Cirta. 
Ben Badis Hospital known for its  modernism architecture and its domes built in 1876. 
Theater of Constantine
Emir Abdelkader Mosque Gardens
Cirta Museum
Constantine University designed by Brazilian architect Oscar Niemeyer the UN building NY designer.
 Souika the medieval city centre known as well as  The Casbah (Kasbah) 
Aqueduct of Constantine Roman aqueduct just in the front side of the hotel.
The Great Mosque of Constantine historical mosque built in 1136.
Pyramid Square famous with its obelisk and the Ottoman canons 
Gap Square known as  Place de la Breche

Transport

Mohamed Boudiaf International Airport
Constantine tramway, University station.
 Coach and buses station

See also
List of hotels in Algeria
Grand Hotel Cirta
Protea Hotel Constantine By Marriott
Novotel Constantine By Accor

References

Hotels in Algeria
Five star hotels
Hotel buildings completed in 2014
Hotels established in 2014
Marriott hotels
Landmarks in Algeria
Buildings and structures in Constantine Province
Economy of Constantine, Algeria
21st-century architecture in Algeria